= How to Love Animals =

2021 book by Henry Mance

How to Love Animals: In a Human-Shaped World
- First edition
- Author: Henry Mance
- Language: English
- Genre: Non-fiction
- Publisher: Viking
- Publication date: July 2021
- Publication place: United States
- ISBN: 978-1-9848-7965-3

How to Love Animals: In a Human-Shaped World is a book by British writer Henry Mance, published in the US by Viking in July 2021. Favorably commented in the Financial Times, The Guardian, and The Telegraph, the book denounces the thoughtless but profound suffering caused each day to millions of individual animals worldwide during the raising and slaughtering of livestock that takes place, allegedly for the sole purpose of bringing nutritionally superfluous meat to the plates of the dominant species, and thus please their pretentious palates. Mance advocates an ethic of compassion towards other species, including a vegan diet and a low-impact lifestyle.
